Monte Masoni is a mountain of Lombardy, Italy. It is located within the Bergamo Alps. The mountain is 2,663 metres above sea level.

Mountains of the Alps
Mountains of Lombardy